Olutayo "Tayo" Fabuluje (born July 17, 1991) is a former American football tackle. He played college football for TCU. Fabuluje was drafted by the Chicago Bears in the sixth round of the 2015 NFL Draft.

College career
In 2010, Tayo Fabuluje redshirted at BYU. He then transferred to TCU, after which he sat out the 2011 season due to transfer rules. During the 2012 season, Fabuluje played all thirteen games, starting in twelve of them. During the 2013 season, he did not play football. He transferred back to BYU, but had no contact with the football team. During the 2014 season, Fabuluje was an Honorable Mention All-Big 12 player. He started twelve games at Left Tackle.

Professional career

Chicago Bears
The Chicago Bears selected Fabuluje with the seventh pick of the sixth round in the 2015 NFL Draft, making him the 183rd pick overall. In his rookie season, Fabuluje violated the NFL's performance-enhancing drug policy and was suspended for four games.

Baltimore Brigade (AFL)
On June 21, 2017, Fabuluje was assigned to the Baltimore Brigade of the Arena Football League.

San Antonio Commanders (AAF)
On October 12, 2018, Fabuluje was signed by the San Antonio Commanders of the AAF. He was released following the team's initial mini-camp in December 2018.

Memphis Express (AAF)
In January 2019, Fabuluje signed with the Memphis Express of the AAF. However, he did not make the final roster. He was placed on injured reserve after clearing waivers. The league ceased operations in April 2019.

Houston Roughnecks
Fabuluje was drafted in the 2020 XFL Draft by the Houston Roughnecks. He was waived on January 13, 2020.

References

External links
Texas Christian Horned Frogs bio

1991 births
Living people
American football offensive tackles
American sportspeople of Nigerian descent
American people of Yoruba descent
Baltimore Brigade players
Chicago Bears players
Houston Roughnecks players
Memphis Express (American football) players
People from Euless, Texas
Players of American football from Texas
San Antonio Commanders players
Sportspeople from the Dallas–Fort Worth metroplex
TCU Horned Frogs football players
Yoruba sportspeople